The 1969 race riots of Singapore were one of the two riots encountered in post-independence Singapore. The seven days of communal riots from 31 May to 6 June 1969.

History
The precursor of the 1969 race riots can be traced to the 13 May Incident in Kuala Lumpur and Petaling Jaya in Malaysia. It was triggered by the results of the General Election, which were marked by Sino-Malay riots unprecedented in Malaysian history – 196 people were killed and over 350 injured between 13 May and 31 July. The real figures could be much higher than officially revealed. The Malaysian government declared a state of emergency and suspended Parliament until 1971.

The disturbances had nothing to do with Singapore but there was an inexorable spillover of the communal violence in Malaysia into Singapore. The 1969 riots occurred not long after the earlier communal riots in 1964. It was said that the 1964 racial disturbances in Singapore contributed towards the eventual separation of Singapore from Malaysia on 9 August 1965. The hysteria that United Malays National Organisation (UMNO) itself generated over its desire to assert Malay dominance (Ketuanan Melayu) in Singapore had its effect in heightening the suspicion between Malay and Chinese in Singapore.

The dissatisfaction of the Malays over their social and economic condition and the fear that the Malays regarded as indigenous (Bumiputra) ownership would be lost, led to the 13 May disturbances.

Rumours and revenge
Rumours began to spread in Singapore about Malay atrocities against the Chinese in Malaysia.  People also talked indignantly about the partiality of the Malaysian Armed Forces in dealing with those suspected of involvement in the rioting; Chinese that were caught were severely punished on the spot and these rumours aggravated tension in Singapore.

The Internal Security Department or ISD, together with the police, helped contain a volatile situation. Sino-Malay tensions surfaced again in Singapore in 1969 following the outbreak of the 1969 racial riots in Malaysia after the General Election. Many incidents of Sino-Malay clashes erupted and the situation was brought under control following security sweeps by the police and armed forces throughout Singapore. The vigilance of the security forces in Singapore and the persistent efforts of ISD officers in making island-wide coverage contributed to the return of normalcy in Singapore.

Aftermath
After 1971, when all had settled down, the Malaysian government was able to follow an affirmative action policy marked particularly by the New Economic Policy (NEP) favouring the Malays. To this day, there is still an unease about the potential of violence as the power struggles between groups continue. In April 1987, four silat (martial arts) experts were arrested by the ISD for actively spreading rumours of impending racial clashes on or around 13 May 1987 (on the 18th anniversary of the May 1969 race riots in Singapore and Malaysia).

See also

List of riots in Singapore
13 May Incident
1964 Race riots
Maria Hertogh riots

References

Notes

Bibliography

 
 Internal Security Department Heritage Centre, Singapore.

History of Singapore
Race Riots of Singapore
Race riots in Singapore
Race Riots of Singapore, 1969
Singapore